Digaro, also Taraon, Tawra, or Darang, is a Digarish language of northeastern Arunachal Pradesh, India and Zayü County, Tibet, China.

Names
According to Jiang, et al. The Kaman (Miju) call them , the Idu call them , and the Assamese call them Digaro Mishmi.

Distribution

India
In Arunachal Pradesh, India, Digaro Mishmi is spoken in Hayuliang, Changlagam, and Goiliang circles in the Amjaw district (Ethnologue). It is also spoken in Dibang Valley district and Assam.

China
Jiang, et al. (2013:2) reports that in Zayü County, Tibet, Taraon is spoken in the following villages.
E River watershed 额河流域
Jiyu village 吉玉村 (alternatively named Juyu 巨玉)
Ciba village 次巴村
Rusu village 如苏村
Demen village 德门村
Zigeng village 自更村
Xiani village 下尼村
Ba'antong 巴安通
Xin village 新村
Sang'ang River watershed 桑昂河流域
Gayao village 嘎尧村
Chayu River watershed 察隅河流域
Dongchong 洞冲, Lower Chayu town 下察隅镇

Phonology

Consonants

Vowels

 /ɨ/ may also be heard as [ɯ].
 /a/ may also be heard as [ʌ] before /k/.

References

Evans, Jonathan P.; Manyu, Johakso (2021). "The sounds of Tawrã (Digaru-Mishmi), a Tibeto-Burman language". Linguistics of the Tibeto-Burman Area. 44 (1): 1–26.
Jiang Huo [江获], Li Daqin [李大勤], Sun Hongkai [孙宏开]. 2013. A study of Taraon [达让语研究]. Beijing: Ethnic Publishing House [民族出版社].

Further reading
Blench, Roger. 2017. A dictionary of Tawrã, a language of Arunachal Pradesh.

Chakravarty, L. N. (1963). A Dictionary of the Taraon Language. NEFA.
Pulu, Jatan (1991). A Phrase Book on Taraon Language. Arunachal Pradesh government.
Sastry, Garimella and Devi Prasada (1984). Mishmi Grammar. CIIL.
Sastry, Garimella and Devi Prasada (1991). Mishmi-English-Hindi Dictionary. CIIL.

Digaro languages
Mishmi languages
Languages of India
Languages of Arunachal Pradesh